Matías Alejandro Galvaliz (born 6 June 1989) is an Argentine professional footballer who plays as an attacking midfielder for Liga Nacional club Guastatoya.

Early life
Galvaliz was born in Rosario, Argentina.

Club career

Motagua
On 25 June 2018, Galvaliz signed with Honduran Liga Nacional side Motagua. He made 27 league and seven playoff appearances that season as Motagua won both the Apertura and Clausura. Galvaliz also made seven appearances in CONCACAF League play, scoring one goal and helping Motagua to a runner-up finish.

In the 2019–20 season, Galvaliz made 22 league appearances, scoring three goals, and another four appearances in the Apertura playoffs. He made another seven appearances in CONCACAF League that year, helping Motagua to another runner-up finish and qualification to CONCACAF Champions League.

On 8 May 2020, Galvaliz re-signed with the club for another year.

Career statistics

References

External links

1989 births
Living people
Association football midfielders
Argentine footballers
Footballers from Rosario, Santa Fe
Argentine expatriate footballers
Expatriate footballers in Honduras
Argentine expatriate sportspeople in Honduras
Rosario Central footballers
Huracán de Comodoro Rivadavia footballers
Tiro Federal footballers
Club Atlético Mitre footballers
Club Atlético Acassuso footballers
Guillermo Brown de Puerto Madryn footballers
Defensores de Belgrano de Villa Ramallo players
F.C. Motagua players
Primera Nacional players
Torneo Argentino A players
Torneo Federal A players
Primera B Metropolitana players
Liga Nacional de Fútbol Profesional de Honduras players